Scleria dregeana is a plant in the family Cyperaceae. It grows as a perennial herb.

Distribution and habitat
Scleria dregeana grows widely in southern Africa. Its habitat is wet places at high altitude.

References

dregeana
Flora of the Democratic Republic of the Congo
Flora of East Tropical Africa
Flora of South Tropical Africa
Flora of Southern Africa
Plants described in 1837